Mundka is a station on the Green Line of the Delhi Metro. It is an elevated station and was inaugurated on 2 April 2010. The station is located in the Mundka locality of West Delhi district, Delhi.

Station layout

Facilities

List of available ATM at Mundka metro station are HDFC Bank, YES Bank

Exits

See also

Delhi
Mundka
List of Delhi Metro stations
Transport in Delhi
Delhi Metro Rail Corporation
Delhi Suburban Railway
Delhi Monorail
Delhi Transport Corporation
South East Delhi
New Delhi
National Capital Region (India)
List of rapid transit systems
List of metro systems

References

External links

 Delhi Metro Rail Corporation Ltd. (Official site) 
 Delhi Metro Annual Reports
 
 UrbanRail.Net – descriptions of all metro systems in the world, each with a schematic map showing all stations.

Delhi Metro stations
Railway stations opened in 2010
Railway stations in West Delhi district